Craig Peter Dargo (born 3 January 1978) is a Scottish former professional football player and coach. Dargo played for Raith Rovers, Kilmarnock, Inverness Caledonian Thistle, St Mirren, Partick Thistle, Dumbarton, Dunfermline Athletic and Berwick Rangers.

Career

Early career
Dargo began his career with Kirkcaldy side Raith Rovers. He scored 29 goals in 82 league games before moving to Kilmarnock on a free transfer in June 2000. He remained at Rugby Park for the next five years. During this time he made his first appearance in European competition, scoring as Kilmarnock were eliminated by Norwegian side Viking in the UEFA Cup. His time at Kilmarnock was dogged by injuries, and he was released in May 2005 after over 100 games for Killie.

Inverness
In June 2005, Dargo joined Inverness Caledonian Thistle on a two-year deal, scoring his first goal during a draw against Rangers at Ibrox Stadium. In February 2006, Dargo began negotiations on a new contract, with former Inverness manager Craig Brewster, now managing Ross County, subsequently linked with signing the player. The speculation passed and Dargo made an appearance for the Scotland Future side in March 2006, going on to score 19 goals in 38 games that season.

In April 2007, weeks before the end of his contract, Inverness confirmed "a few English clubs" had expressed interest in signing Dargo. A "last go" in mid May – a record deal for the club – failed to keep him at the club, with Dargo announcing in June that he would leave Inverness.

St Mirren
On 28 June 2007, Dargo signed for St Mirren. Dargo aggravated his recurring knee injury which kept him out for several weeks, making debut against former club Kilmarnock on 22 December 2007. Dargo scored his first goal for the club against Gretna to officially relegate them on 29 March 2008.

Later playing career
On 17 November 2011, Dargo signed a short-term contract with Partick Thistle ending in January 2012. On 8 March 2012, Dargo signed a short-term contract with Dumbarton until the end of the season. He became a player/coach at Dunfermline Athletic in 2012, working alongside John Potter. Dargo signed for Berwick Rangers on 19 August 2014. He scored his first and only goals for Berwick when he scored twice in a 3-2 Scottish Cup win against East Fife.

Statistics

References

External links

1978 births
Association football forwards
Inverness Caledonian Thistle F.C. players
Kilmarnock F.C. players
Living people
Footballers from Edinburgh
Raith Rovers F.C. players
Scotland B international footballers
Scotland under-21 international footballers
Scottish Football League players
Scottish footballers
Scottish Premier League players
St Mirren F.C. players
Partick Thistle F.C. players
Dumbarton F.C. players
Dunfermline Athletic F.C. players
Berwick Rangers F.C. players
Scottish Professional Football League players